Helmerich is a German surname and may refer to:

 Helmerich & Payne, an American petroleum contract drilling company
 Helmerich Award, a literary prize

People with the surname
 T. J. Helmerich, American musician
 Peggy V. Helmerich (born 1928), actress and philanthropist known as Peggy Dow

See also
Stefan Helmreich, American anthropologist
William B. Helmreich (1945-2020), American sociologist